Céline Boucher is a Canadian artist working in the fields of painting, drawing and sculpture.

Boucher was born in 1945 in Sainte-Béatrix, Quebec.

Collections
Comme un oiseau, painting, 1983, Musée national des beaux-arts du Québec

References

External links

1945 births
21st-century Canadian painters
21st-century Canadian sculptors
21st-century Canadian women artists
Artists from Montreal
Canadian illustrators
Canadian women painters
Canadian women sculptors
Living people
People from Lanaudière